A Singer Must Die is a collaboration between the Canadian music organization Art of Time Ensemble and vocalist Steven Page. It is Page's first release following his departure from Barenaked Ladies, although it was recorded before he left the band and originally conceived as a side project, and his first solo album since 2005's The Vanity Project. It contains ten tracks, all of which are cover versions. Page performed all of the songs on the album live with the Art of Time Ensemble on June 20 and 21, 2008 at the Enwave Theatre in Toronto. The concert was broadcast on CBC radio the following month. Originally, the live concert was not intended to result in an album, but because of the success of the concert, they decided to go into the studio to record the songs.

The album was put on Page's website for preorder about a month before its release. A certain number of preordered copies were autographed by Page, as well as Andrew Burashko, who is the pianist in the Art of Time Ensemble.

Track listing

(Original artists in parenthesis)

Personnel
Steven Page - Vocals, guitar on I Want You
Andrew Burashko - Piano
Robert Carli - Saxophone & Clarinet
Margaret Jordan-Gay - Cello
Elissa Lee - Violin
Joseph Phillips - Bass
Rob Piltch - Guitars

Production
Producer: Jonathan Goldsmith
Engineering: Walter Sobczak
Mixing: Paul Forgues
Mastering: Peter J. Moore
Recorded at Puck's Farm. 
Mixed at Fresh Baked Woods

References

External links
Steven Page Shop.com

2010 albums
Art of Time Ensemble albums
Steven Page albums
Orchestral pop albums